Caddo agilis is a species of harvestman in the family Caddidae. It is found in North America.

References

Further reading

 
 

Harvestmen
Articles created by Qbugbot
Animals described in 1892
Taxa named by Nathan Banks